Peterborough City Hall is the seat of municipal government of Peterborough, Ontario, Canada. It is a -storey building, located at 500 George Street North, across the street from Confederation Park, the Drill Hall and Armouries and Peterborough Collegiate. The complex consists of two buildings: the City Hall built in 1951 and the former Carnegie Library built in 1911.

History

Carnegie Building 

The north wing of the City Hall was the original location of the Peterborough Public Library. Built 1910-1911 using funds from the Andrew Carnegie Foundation, it was one of only 125 Carnegie libraries in Canada. The library was built in the Beaux-Arts style by prominent local architect John E. Belcher. The building also housed the collection of the Victoria Museum, the precursor to the Peterborough Museum & Archives.

City Hall 
The cornerstone was laid on December 1, 1950, by Leslie Frost, Premier of Ontario, and City Hall was officially opened in October 1951 by Charlotte Whitton, Mayor of Ottawa, and the mayor of Peterborough, England. The sandstone building is a late example of Beaux-Arts architecture inspired by the City Beautiful movement. It was designed by Marani & Morris and built by Eastwood Construction.

The lobby features a marble terrazzo-tiled floor depicting a map of Peterborough County with brass inlay.

Today 
City Hall is home to the administrative offices and municipal services of the City of Peterborough. The Peterborough City Council meets in the Council Chambers on the second floor.

See also 
 Peterborough Public Library
 Peterborough City Council

References 

City and town halls in Ontario
Buildings and structures in Peterborough, Ontario
1951 establishments in Ontario
Government buildings completed in 1951
Politics of Peterborough, Ontario
Beaux-Arts architecture in Canada
Designated heritage properties in Ontario